Orange Isle is an isle in Xiang River, Changsha, Hunan, China. It also known by other names, such as Ju Isle and Shuilu Isle. It was also a national AAAAA (5A) level tourist attraction and a national key scenic spot.

History 

The first known instance of Orange Isle being documented appeared in 305 B.C., during the Yongxing era of the reign of Emperor Hui of Jin during the Jin Dynasty (266–420).

During the Tang dynasty (618–907), poet Du Fu wrote a poem Visiting Daolin Temple and Yuelushan Temple, which mentioned Orange Isle. It had been on the list of The Eight Views of Xiaoxiang - River and Sky: Sunset Snow.

Orange Isle was opened in 1904, during the late Qing dynasty (1644–1911).

From 1911 to 1949, many foreign embassies and consulates were built on the isle.

During Mao Zedong's early years, he lived in Changsha. He and his friends He Shuheng, Xiao Zisheng, Cai Hesen, Xiao San and Xiang Jingyu would swim in the Xiang River.

Since the 2010s, the Orange Isle Music Festival has been hosted on the isle.

On 20 December 2009, the Youth Mao Zedong Statue was built on the isle.

Attractions 
 Hunan Culture Corridor
 On-water Amusement Corridor
 Orange Garden
 Garden of the Nature
 Park of Harmonious Guests
 Plaza of Shopping and Foods
 GYM Center
 Relaxation Resort
 Wildlife Park

Gallery

Transportation 
 Orange Isle Bridge, opened in 1972 as the first bridge crossing the Xiang River north of Hengyang, connects directly to the island's road network via two ramps, serving both eastbound and westbound traffic. Public access is restricted from 7:00 AM to 10:00 PM on weekends and national holidays.
 Juzizhou station on Changsha Metro's Line 2, opened in 2014, provides direct access to the park for pedestrians.

References

Bibliography

External links 

Geography of Changsha
Tourist attractions in Changsha
Islands of Hunan
River islands of China